Funk, Inc. was an American jazz funk/soul jazz group, founded in Indianapolis, Indiana, United States, in 1969 by Bobby Watley, Eugene Barr, Steve Weakley, Jimmy Munford and Cecil Hunt. During the 1970s they were signed to the Prestige Records label for whom they recorded five albums, though they later disbanded in 1976.

Former member, Cecil Hunt, who was born on July 27, 1940, died on April 12, 2015, in his birthplace of Indianapolis, Indiana.

Discography

Studio albums

Compilation albums
1988: Acid Inc: The Best of Funk Inc.

References

External links
 

American funk musical groups
Soul-jazz musicians